Tyrwhitt is an English language surname. It may refer to:

Charles Tyrwhitt (1846–1874), English explorer
Elizabeth Tyrwhitt (1519–1578), English writer and courtier
Gerald Tyrwhitt-Wilson (1883–1950), British composer
Jaqueline Tyrwhitt (1905–1983), British architect
Mary Tyrwhitt (1903–1997), British soldier
Montague Tyrwhitt-Drake (1830–1908), Canadian politician
Nicholas Charles Tyrwhitt Wheeler (born 1965), English businessman and founder of Charles Tyrwhitt
Reginald Tyrwhitt (1870–1951), British admiral
Richard Tyrwhitt (1844–1900), Canadian politician
Robert Tyrwhitt (by 1504–1572), British politician
Robert Tyrwhitt (c. 1510–1581), British politician
Robert Tyrwhitt (1735–1817), British scholar
St John Tyrwhitt (1905–1961), British admiral
Thomas Tyrwhitt (1730–1786), British scholar
Thomas Tyrwhitt (1762–1833), British politician
Ursula Tyrwhitt (1872–1966), English artist 
William Tyrwhitt (MP died 1522), English courtier and MP
William Tyrwhitt (died 1591), English MP

See also
Charles Tyrwhitt, a British menswear retailer
Mount Tyrwhitt, Alberta, Canada
Tyrwhitt baronets in the British peerage

English-language surnames